The United Koreans in Japan official football team represents the Korean population living in Japan. The team includes players holding passports from North Korea, South Korea and Japan. The team, run by the United Korean Football Association in Japan (UKFAJ), joined ConIFA in 2015, and played its first matches at the 2016 ConIFA World Football Cup.

History
The national team grew out of the local football club for Koreans in Japan, FC Korea, which formed in 1961 and currently plays in the Kanto Soccer League, and is still the base of the national team. Upon its formation, it joined ConIFA, and became one of the Asian teams invited to play at the 2016 ConIFA World Football Cup on 9 January 2016. The team progressed to the quarter finals after beating Székely Land 1-0 in the group stages, but lost on penalties to Northern Cyprus, thus putting them in the placement rounds, where they eventually finished 7th in the overall competition.

In 2018 they were confirmed as participating in the 2018 ConIFA World Football Cup. For the tournament, they appointed former North Korean international An Yong-hak as player-manager.

Matches
Legend

Coaching staff

Managerial history

Players

Current squad
The following players were called up to the squad to face Panjab, Western Armenia and Kabylie at the 2018 ConIFA World Football Cup in London from 31 May to 10 June.

Caps and goals correct as of 1 May 2018, when the squad was announced.

Notable players

  Lee Tong-soung - played for Staines Town 
  An Yong-hak
   Son Min-chol

References

Football in Korea
CONIFA member associations
Zainichi Korean culture